Emoia baudini, also known commonly as Baudin's emo skink, Baudin's skink, and the Great Bight cool-skink, is a species of lizard in the family Scincidae. The species is native to New Guinea, Maluku, and Sulawesi.

Etymology
The specific name, baudini, is in honour of French explorer Nicolas Baudin.

Common names
In addition to the above English common names, E. baudini is known as mas in the Kalam language of Papua New Guinea.

Habitat
The preferred natural habitat of E. baudini is forest.

Reproduction
E. baudini is viviparous.

References

Further reading
Barbour T (1912). "A Contribution to the Zoögeography of the East Indian Islands". Memoirs of the Museum of Comparative Zoölogy at Harvard College 44 (1): 1–203 + Plates 1–8. (Emoia baudinii, p. 94).
Boulenger GA (1887). Catalogue of the Lizards in the British Museum (Natural History). Second Edition. Volume III. ... Scincidae ...London: Trustees of the British Museum (Natural History). (Taylor and Francis, printers). xii + 575 pp. + Plates I–XL. (Lygosoma baudinii, new combination, pp. 296–297). 
Duméril AMC, Bibron G (1839). Erpétologie générale ou Histoire naturelle complète des Reptiles. Tome cinquième [Volume 5]. Paris: Roret. viii + 854 pp. {Gongylus (Eumeces) baudinii, new species, pp. 653–654}. (in French).
Gray JE (1845). Catalogue of the Specimens of Lizards in the Collection of the British Museum. London: Trustees of the British Museum. (Edward Newman, printer). xxviii + 289 pp. (Mabouya baudinii, new combination, p. 95).

baudini
Skinks of New Guinea
Reptiles described in 1839
Taxa named by André Marie Constant Duméril
Taxa named by Gabriel Bibron